Little Brewster Island is a rocky outer island in the Boston Harbor Islands National Recreation Area. It is best known as the location of Boston Light, one of only five remaining Coast Guard-staffed lighthouses in the United States, and an important navigation aid for traffic to and from the Port of Boston.

Like the neighboring islands of Great Brewster, Middle Brewster and Outer Brewster, Little Brewster Island is named after William Brewster, the first preacher and teacher for the Plymouth Colony. Because it is still the site of an active Coast Guard facility, opportunities to visit the island are restricted, although guided tours of the island and lighthouse are available.

See also

Green Island (Massachusetts)
Long Island
Tewksbury Rock (Massachusetts)

References

External links
Little Brewster Island web page, with visitor information.

 

Boston Harbor islands
Islands of Suffolk County, Massachusetts